Commercial Street is a pedestrianised shopping street in Leeds, West Yorkshire, England.

History
The street was first developed by William Hey II as Bond Street in 1823–1824, and was renamed to Commercial Street several years later. Leeds Library, the oldest surviving subscription library in the UK, is located on this street.

References

pedestrian streets in the United Kingdom
shopping streets in Leeds